The franc (sign: F or Fr), also commonly distinguished as the  (FF), was a currency of France. Between 1360 and 1641, it was the name of coins worth 1 livre tournois and it remained in common parlance as a term for this amount of money. It was reintroduced (in decimal form) in 1795. After two centuries of inflation, it was redenominated in 1960, with each  (NF) being worth 100 old francs. The NF designation was continued for a few years before the currency returned to being simply the franc. Many French residents, though, continued to quote prices of especially expensive items in terms of the old franc (equivalent to the new centime), up to and even after the introduction of the euro (for coins and banknotes) in 2002. The French franc was a commonly held international reserve currency of reference in the 19th and 20th centuries. Between 1998 and 2002, the conversion of francs to euros was carried out at a rate of 6.55957 francs to 1 euro.

History

The French Franc traces its origins to the Carolingian monetary system of the 8th century AD, and more specifically to the Livre Tournois, an offshoot of the same system which emerged in the 13th century. Here is a table of changes to the value of the Livre Parisis and the Livre Tournois in terms of silver or gold until the French Franc was introduced in 1795.

Carolingian, 781 

Emperor Charlemagne's monetary system was introduced in 781 AD to the Frankish Carolingian Empire and spread over the centuries to much of Western Europe, with a Livre (pound) of silver divided into 20 Sols or Sous (shillings) and the Sol divided into 12 Deniers (penny). Only the denier existed as a coin for the next 500 years, with the sou and livre functioning as accounting multiples of the denier. The first livre and denier weighed 407.92 g and 1.7 g, respectively, of the finest silver available.

Capetian, c. 1000 
Livres and deniers issued  under the Capetian dynasty contained 305.94 g and 1.27475 g fine silver, respectively. The French Mark of 8 ounces was a unit of weight equal to 244.752 grams, and equal in weight to 192 deniers or 16 sols of this period.

In subsequent centuries the French kings would struggle to implement fixed standards for the livre over a decentralized realm of Frankish feudal rulers, many of whom claimed the right to issue currency within their own domains, and often resorting to currency debasements in moments of stringency. While monetary values as proclaimed by French kings would eventually be identified as the Livre Parisis, other regions almost always got by with currencies of lower standard. One such currency, the Livre Tournois, would eventually become the preferred accounting system under a more centralized French kingdom.

Louis IX, 1266

The emergence of the Livre Tournois as France's preferred accounting system occurred during the reign of King Louis IX with the issuance of the silver Gros tournois with 58 issued to a French Mark of silver of fineness  (hence 4.044 g fine silver in a gros), and valued at 1 sol (12 deniers) in France's Touraine region though valued less than 1 sol Parisis. The new coin's reputation and handling convenience versus those of debased deniers assured the adoption of the gros tournois to the rest of Western Europe.

Late Capetian, 1317
Towards the reign of King Philip IV le Bel came pressures to further debase the denier, which occurred in 1317 when the Gros Tournois was raised to 15 deniers Tournois or 12 deniers (1 sol) Parisis, thus commencing the fixed parity of 4 deniers Parisis to 5 deniers Tournois. While French kings would continue to prescribe coin values in multiples of 4 and 12 deniers Parisis until the end of the 15th century, the rest of France would gradually choose to recognize their increased values in multiples of 5 and 15 deniers Tournois.

Hundred Years' War, 1361

The start of the Hundred Years' War against England in 1337 would increase the pressure to further debase the French livre. An attempt in 1343 to reverse earlier depreciations of circulating deniers and reinstate the old 1317-era gros tournois (forte monnaie, or strong money) caused financial havoc especially with borrowers who received depreciated coins and who then had to repay debts in forte monnaie. Lower valuations for the livre had to be accepted subsequently as the war raged on.

In 1361 the gros tournois of 15 deniers Tournois (1 sol Parisis) was minted at 84 to a French Mark of silver, 23/24 fine (hence, 2.79 g fine silver in a gros).  At the same time gold flowing from Southern Europe started to become an important medium of exchange in the North, so gold francs worth 1 livre Tournois (16 sols Parisis) were minted at 63 to a French Mark of fine gold (hence, 3.885 g in a franc). Gold as circulating currency would henceforth continue in the form of Écu d’ors of varying gold content.

The gold franc worth one livre tournois was introduced in 1360 to pay the ransom of King John II of France. This coin secured the king's freedom and showed him on a richly decorated horse earning it the name franc à cheval (meaning "free on horse" in French). The obverse legend, like other French coins, gives the king's title as Francorum Rex ("King of the Franks" in Latin) and provides another reason to call the coin a franc. John's son, Charles V, continued this type. It was copied exactly at Brabant and Cambrai and, with the arms on the horse cloth changed, at Flanders. Conquests led by Joan of Arc allowed Charles VII to return to sound coinage and he revived the franc à cheval. John II, however, was not able to strike enough francs to pay his ransom and he voluntarily returned to English captivity.

John II died as a prisoner in England and his son, Charles V was left to pick up the pieces. Charles V pursued a policy of reform, including stable coinage. An edict dated 20 April 1365 established the centrepiece of this policy, a gold coin officially called the denier d’or aux fleurs de lis which had a standing figure of the king on its obverse, pictured under a canopy. Its value in money of account was one livre tournois, just like the franc à cheval, and this coin is universally known as a franc à pied. In accordance with the theories of the mathematician, economist and royal advisor Nicole Oresme, Charles struck fewer coins of better quality gold than his ancestors. In the accompanying deflation, both prices and wages fell, but wages fell faster and debtors had to settle up in better money than they had borrowed. The Mayor of Paris, Étienne Marcel, exploited their discontent to lead the Jacquerie revolt which forced Charles V out of the city. The franc fared better. It became associated with money stable at one livre tournois.

Lancastrian War, 1425
A certain degree of peace achieved at the start of the 15th century helped settle the value of French currency. After 1422 the gros of 1 sol Parisis was minted at 96 to a French Mark,  fine (hence 1.912 g per gros), while the Écu of 20 sols Parisis was minted at 64 to a French Mark,  karats or  fine (hence 3.585 g per écu). The gros and the écu compared favourably with England's 2-pence coin of 1.8 g silver and 40-pence (th of a pound) half-noble coin of 3.48 g gold, resulting in an approximate exchange rate of 1 pound sterling to six Livres Parisis.
 
Peace in the Burgundian Netherlands after the 1420s also resulted in the 1434 realignment of the Flemish monetary system with the French livre. The new Flemish Guilder (Pound) of 20 Stuiver (shilling) contained 32.6 g fine silver and was approximately par with the Livre Parisis of 20 sols (38.24 g). Such parities between the French livres to the Flemish and English currencies would persist up to the 1560s and would facilitate the issue of identical coin denominations across these countries.

Louis XI, 1475

The Great Bullion Famine of the mid-15th century resulted in yet another debasement during the reign of King Louis XI, with the Livre Parisis reduced to 1 French ounce (30.594 g) fine silver or 2.620 g fine gold. The silver gros was minted at 69 to the French Mark,  fine (3.4 g fine silver) and was valued at th the Livre Parisis (or 2  sols). The gold écu au soleil was minted at 72 to the Mark,  karats fine (3.2754 g fine gold), and was valued at 25 Sols Parisis. The close of the 15th century saw the beginnings of a more centralized French currency system and the discontinuation of competing currency systems within France.

The Livre Parisis of 1 French ounce approximately matched the silver content of th pound sterling (1 troy ounce of sterling silver). It would also become the model for Germany when it started issuing the 1-ounce silver Guldengroschen divided into 21 Groschen (gros, shillings) or 252 Pfennige (pence).

Valois-Angoulême, 1549
A considerable acceleration in the debasement of the French, English and Dutch currencies occurred during the reign of the Valois-Angoulême kings in the 16th century amidst the huge influx of precious metals from the American continent arriving through the Habsburg Netherlands. The loose enforcement of monetary standards in the Dutch provinces resulted in a significant rd reduction in the value of the French livre by 1549, with debasements continuing into the 17th century.

The French ounce (30.594 g) of fine silver was raised in value from 1 to  Livre Parisis (or from 25 to  sols Tournois). This 50% advance was also seen in England in 1551 when it raised its troy ounce of sterling silver from 40 to 60 pence, and in the 17th century when Germany raised its one-ounce silver Thaler from 1 to  silver gulden.

The 16th century saw the issuance of larger silver coins, first in testoons (9 g fine silver, valued at 11 sols Tournois in 1549), and later on in silver francs (12.3 g fine silver, valued at 1 Livre Tournois in 1577). These French coins, however, were much less popular than the 1-ounce silver coins coming out of Spain, the Netherlands and Germany, leading to the 1641 currency reform under King Louis XIII.

Henry III exploited the association of the franc as sound money worth one livre tournois when he sought to stabilize French currency in 1577. By this time, inflows of gold and silver from Spanish America had caused inflation throughout the world economy and the kings of France, who weren't getting much of this wealth, only made things worse by manipulating the values assigned to their coins. The States General which met at Blois in 1577 added to the public pressure to stop currency manipulation. Henry III agreed to do this and he revived the franc, now as a silver coin valued at one livre tournois. This coin and its fractions circulated until 1641 when Louis XIII of France replaced it with the silver écu. Nevertheless, the name "franc" continued in accounting as a synonym for the livre tournois.

Louis XIII, 1641

In the 17th century King Louis XIII abolished its unpopular coinage of francs and ecus in favour of Spanish-modelled coins. It also abolished the Livre Parisis system in favour of exclusive use of the Livre Tournois. The Spanish dollar was the model for the Louis d’Argent – 9 to a French Mark (244.752 g) of silver,  fine (hence 24.93 g fine silver), and valued at 3 livres tournois. The Spanish doubloon or two-escudo coin was the model for the Louis d'Or – 36  to a French Mark of gold,  fine (hence 6.189 g fine gold), and valued at 10 livres.

Louis XV, 1726

France entered another turbulent period during the War of the Spanish Succession from 1701 to 1714, resulting in another debasement of the livre tournois. Under King Louis XV's reign in 1726 the silver Écu d'Argent was issued at 8.3 to a Mark of silver, 11/12 fine (hence 27.03 g fine silver), and valued at 6 livres. A new gold Louis d'Or was also issued at 30 to a Mark of gold, 11/12 fine (hence 7.4785 g fine gold), and valued at 24 livres.

Louis XVI, 1785
The rise in the value of gold at the onset of the Industrial Revolution in Great Britain and elsewhere as well as King Louis XVI's reign led to the rise in the Gold-Silver Ratio to 15.5, resulting in the reduction in the gold content of the 24-livre Louis d'Or from 1/30th to 1/32nd of a Mark, 11/12 fine. While the silver standard remained unchanged, assays of the period indicate that coins contained approximately 1.5% less bullion than officially specified. The 1795 swapping of livres to francs at the rate of 1.0125 livres = 1 franc suggest that the 6-livre ecu contained 26.67 g fine silver while the reduced 24-livre Louis contained 6.88 g fine gold.

The livre tournois was swapped in 1795 for the French Franc (or franc germinal), worth 4.5 g silver or  g = 0.29032 g gold (ratio 15.5), at a rate of 1 franc =  livres or 1 livre, 3 deniers.

French Revolution 

The decimal "franc" was established as the national currency by the National Convention of Revolutionary France in 1795 as a decimal unit (1 franc = 10 décimes = 100 centimes) of 4.5 g of fine silver. This was slightly less than the livre of 4.505 g, but the franc was set in 1796 at 1.0125 livres (1 livre, 3 deniers), reflecting in part the past minting of sub-standard coins. Silver coins now had their denomination clearly marked as "5 FRANCS" and it was made obligatory to quote prices in francs. This ended the ancien régime's practice of striking coins with no stated denomination, such as the Louis d'or, and periodically issuing royal edicts to manipulate their value in terms of money of account, i.e. the Livre tournois. The franc became the official currency of France in 1799.

Coinage with explicit denominations in decimal fractions of the franc also began in 1795. Decimalization of the franc was mandated by an act of 7 April 1795, which also dealt with the decimalization of weights and measures. France led the world in adopting the metric system and it was the second country to convert from a non-decimal to a decimal currency, following Russia's conversion in 1704, and the third country to adopt a decimal coinage, also following the United States in 1787. France's first decimal coinage used allegorical figures symbolizing revolutionary principles, like the coinage designs the United States had adopted in 1793.

The circulation of this metallic currency declined during the Republic: the old gold and silver coins were taken out of circulation and exchanged for printed assignats, initially issued as bonds backed by the value of the confiscated goods of churches, but later declared as legal tender currency. The withdrawn gold and silver coins were used to finance the French Revolutionary Wars and to import food, which was in short supply.

As during the "Mississippi Bubble" in 1715–1720, too many assignats were put in circulation, exceeding the value of the "national properties", and the coins, due also to military requisitioning and hoarding, rarefied to pay foreign suppliers. With national government debt remaining unpaid, and a shortage of silver and brass to mint coins, confidence in the new currency declined, leading to hyperinflation, more food riots, severe political instability and termination of the First French Republic and the political fall of the French Convention. Then followed the economic failure of the Directoire: coins were still very rare. After a coup d'état that led to the Consulate, the First Consul progressively acquired sole legislative power at the expense of the other unstable and discredited consultative and legislative institutions.

French Empire and Restoration 

In 1800 the Banque de France, a federal establishment with a private board of executives, was created and commissioned to produce the national currency. In 1803, the Franc germinal (named after the month Germinal in the revolutionary calendar) was established, creating a gold franc containing 290.034 mg of fine gold. From this point, gold and silver-based units circulated interchangeably on the basis of a 1:15.5 ratio between the values of the two metals (bimetallism) until 1864, when all silver coins except the 5-franc piece were debased from 90% to 83.5% silver without the weights changing.

This coinage included the first modern gold coins with denominations in francs. It abandoned the revolutionary symbols of the coinage 1795, now showing Napoleon in the manner of Roman emperors, first described as "Bonaparte Premier Consul" and with the country named as "République Française". After his coronation in 1804 coins changed the obverse legend to "Napoleon Empereur", dropping his family name in the manner of regnal names. In 1807, the reverse legend changed to name France as "Empire Français". In analogy with the old Louis d'or these coins were called Gold Napoleons. Economically, this sound money was a great success and Napoleon's fall did not change that. Succeeding governments maintained Napoleon's weight standard, with changes in design which traced the political history of France. In particular, this currency system was retained during the Bourbon Restoration and perpetuated until 1914.

Latin Monetary Union
France was a founding member of the Latin Monetary Union (LMU), a single currency employed primarily by the Romance-speaking and other Mediterranean states between 1865 and the First World War. The common currency was based on the franc germinal, with the name franc already being used in Switzerland and Belgium, whilst other countries minted local denominations, redeemable across the bloc with 1-to-1 parity, though with local names: e.g., the peseta. In 1873, the LMU went over to a purely gold standard of 1 franc = 0.290322581 grams of gold.

World War I

The outbreak of World War I caused France to leave the gold standard of the LMU. The war severely undermined the franc's strength: war expenditure, inflation and postwar reconstruction, financed partly by printing ever more money, reduced the franc's purchasing power by 70% between 1915 and 1920. After a brief appreciation of the franc during the Depression of 1920–1921, it depreciated a further 43% between 1922 and a balancing of the budget in 1926. This devaluation was aggravated by the insistence of the Republican U.S. federal government and World War Foreign Debts Commission that France's war debts be repaid within 25 years at a minimal 4.25 percent interest per year. The currency devaluation contributed to French demands for high reparations payments from Germany. After a brief return to the gold standard between 1928 and 1936, the currency was allowed to resume its slide, until in 1959 it was worth less than 2.5% of its 1934 value.

World War II 

During the Nazi occupation of France (1940–44), the franc was a satellite currency of the German Reichsmark. The exchange rate was 20 francs for 1 RM. The coins were changed, with the words Travail, famille, patrie (Work, Family, Fatherland) replacing the Republican triad Liberté, égalité, fraternité (Liberty, Equality, Fraternity), with the emblem of the Vichy regime added.

After the Liberation, the US attempted to impose the use of the US occupation franc, which was averted by General De Gaulle.

Post-War period

After World War II, France devalued its currency within the Bretton Woods system on several occasions. Beginning in 1945 at a rate of 480 francs to the British Pound (119.1 to the U.S. dollar), by 1949 the rate was 980 to the Pound (350 to the Dollar). This was reduced further in 1957 and 1958, reaching 1382.3 to the Pound (493.7 to the Dollar, equivalent to 1 franc = 1.8 mg pure gold).

New franc 

In January 1960 the French franc was revalued, with 100 existing francs making one nouveau franc. 
The abbreviation "NF" was used on the 1958 design banknotes until 1963. Old one- and two-franc coins continued to circulate as new centimes (no new centimes were minted for the first two years). The one-centime coin never circulated widely. 
Inflation continued to erode the franc's value: between 1950 and 1960, price levels increased 72 per cent (5.7% per year on average); between 1960 and 1970, it increased 51 per cent (4.2%). 
Only one further major devaluation occurred (11% in August 1969) before the Bretton Woods system was replaced by free-floating exchange rates. When the Euro replaced the franc on 1 January 1999, the franc was worth less than an eighth of its original 1960 purchasing power.

After revaluation and the introduction of the new franc, many French people continued to use the term "old francs" (anciens francs) for large sums, for example for the prices of houses, apartments, and cars. This was common until the introduction of the euro and even later. Many people, old and young – even those who had never used the old franc – still quoted prices in old francs, confusing tourists and people abroad. For example, lottery prizes were most often advertised in amounts of centimes, equivalent to the old franc, to inflate the perceived value of the prizes at stake. Multiples of 10NF were occasionally referred to as "mille francs" (thousand francs) or "mille balles" ("balle" being a slang word for franc) in contexts where it was clear that the speaker did not mean 1,000 new francs. 
The expression "heavy franc" (franc lourd) was also commonly used to designate the new franc.

All franc coins and banknotes ceased to be legal tender in January 2002, upon the official adoption of the Euro.

Economic and Monetary Union
From 1 January 1999, the value exchange rate of the French franc against the Euro was set at a fixed parity of €1 = 6.55957 F. Euro coins and notes replaced the franc entirely between 1 January and 17 February 2002.

Coins

Before World War I

In August 1795, the Monetary Law replaced the livre ("pound") with the franc, which was divided into 10 décimes ("tenths") and 100 centimes ("hundredths"). Copper coins were issued in the denominations of 1 centime, 5 centimes, 1 décime, and 2 décimes, designed by Augustin Dupré. After 1801, French copper coins became rare.

The 5-centime copper coin was called a sou, referring to "sole" (fr. Latin: solidus), until the 1920s.

An Imperial 10-décime coin was produced in billon from 1807 to 1810.

During the Consulship period (1799–1804) silver francs were struck in decimal coinage. A five-franc coin was first introduced in 1801–02 (L’AN 10), half-franc, one-franc, and gold 40-franc coins were introduced in 1802–03 (L’AN 11), and quarter-franc and two-franc coins in 1803–04 (L’AN 12).

The 5-franc silver coin was called an écu, after the six-livre silver coin of the ancien regime, until the 1880s.

Copper coins were rarely issued between 1801 and 1848, so the quarter franc was the lowest current denomination in circulation. But during this period, copper coins from earlier periods circulated. A Napoleon 5-centime coin (in bell metal) and Napoleon and Restoration 1-décime coins were minted.

A new bronze coinage was introduced from 1848. The Second Republic Monetary Authority minted a 1-centime copper coin with a 1795 design. 2, 5 and 10-centime coins were issued from 1853. The quarter franc was discontinued, with silver 20-centime coins issued between 1849 and 1868 as the smallest silver coin produced in France.

The gold coinage also changed. 40-franc coins were last struck in 1839 (with just 23 coins minted). Several new denomination were introduced as gold coinage: 5 gold francs (1856), 10 gold francs (1850), 50 gold francs (1855), and 100 gold francs (1855). A second design for the 100 gold franc coin was released in 1878 depicting standing genius writing the constitution. The pictured example (1889) was issued as a proof and only 100 coins were struck.
 
The last gold 5-franc pieces were minted in 1869, and silver 5-franc coins were last minted in 1878. After 1815, the 20-franc gold coin was called a "napoléon" (royalists still called this coin a "louis"), and so that is the colloquial term for this coin until the present. During the Belle Époque, the 100-franc gold coin was called a "monaco", referring to the flourishing casino business in Monte Carlo.

Nickel 25-centime coins were introduced in 1903.

World War I
World War I and the aftermath brought substantial changes to the coinage. Gold coinage was suspended and the franc was debased. Smaller, holed 5, 10, and 25-centime coins minted in nickel or cupro-nickel were introduced in 1914, finally replacing copper in 1921. In 1920, 1 and 2-centime coins were discontinued and production of silver coinage ceased, with aluminium-bronze 50-centime, 1-franc, and 2-franc coins introduced. Until 1929, these coins were issued by the chambers of commerce, bearing the phrase bon pour on it (meaning: "good for"). At the beginning of the 1920s, chambers of commerce also issued small change coins in aluminium. In 1929, the original franc germinal of 1795 was replaced by the franc Poincaré, which was valued at 20% of the 1803 gold standard.

In 1929, silver coins were reintroduced in 10-franc and 20-franc denominations. A very rare gold 100-franc coin was minted between 1929 and 1936.

In 1933, a nickel 5-franc coin was minted, but was soon replaced by a large aluminium-bronze 5-franc coin.

From World War II to the currency reform

The events of the Second World War also affected the coinage substantially. In 1941, aluminium replaced aluminium-bronze in the 50 centimes, and 1, 2, and 5 francs as copper and nickel were diverted into the War Effort. In 1942, following German occupation and the installation of the French Vichy State, a new, short lived series of coins was released which included holed 10 and 20 centimes in zinc. 50 centimes, and 1 and 2 francs were aluminium. In 1944 this series was discontinued and withdrawn and the previous issue was resumed.

Following the war, rapid inflation caused denominations below 1 franc to be withdrawn from circulation while 10 francs in copper nickel were introduced, followed by reduced size 10-franc coins in aluminium-bronze in 1950, along with 20 and 50-franc coins of the same composition. In 1954, copper-nickel 100 francs were introduced.

In the 1960s, 1 and 2 (old) franc aluminium coins were still circulating, used as "centimes".

New franc
In 1960, the new franc was introduced, worth 100 old francs. Stainless steel 1 and 5 centimes, aluminium-bronze 10, 20, and 50 centimes, nickel 1 franc and silver 5 francs were introduced. Silver 10-franc coins were introduced in 1965, followed by a new, smaller aluminium-bronze 5-centime and a smaller nickel -franc coin in 1966.

A first attempt to introduce a nickel 2-franc coin in 1960 failed.

Nickel-clad copper-nickel 5-franc and nickel-brass 10-franc coins replaced their silver counterparts in 1970 and 1974, respectively. Nickel 2 francs were finally introduced in 1979, followed by bimetallic 10 francs in 1988 and trimetallic 20 francs in 1992. The 20-franc coin was composed of two rings and a centre plug.

A nickel 10-franc piece was issued on 22 October 1986, in an attempt to increase usability, reduce counterfeiting, and make it easier for vending machines to recognise. While 120 million were released into circulation, circulation was halted on 26 November due to confusion with the half-franc and an unpopular design. The coin was subsequently withdrawn on 19 December and became demonetized at the end of June the next year. This led to the conception of the later bimetallic model. The aluminium-bronze pieces continued to circulate until the bimetallic pieces were developed and additional aluminium-bronze coins were minted to replace those initially withdrawn. Once the bimetallic coins were circulating and produced in necessary quantities, the aluminium-bronze pieces were gradually withdrawn and demonetized.

A .900 silver 50-franc piece was issued from 1974 to 1980, known as the largest silver coin ever minted in France, (due to its face value in accordance to its size) but was withdrawn and demonetized after the price of silver spiked in 1980. Then, in 1982, a 100-franc piece, also in .900 silver, was issued, and circulated to a small extent, until the introduction of the euro.

At the time of the complete changeover to the euro on 1 January 2002, coins in circulation (some produced as recently as 2000) were:

 1 centime (~ 0.15 euro cents) stainless steel, rarely circulated (last production stopped first in 1982, then in 1987 due to high production cost, and lack of demand due to its very low value).
 5 centimes (~ 0.76 cents) aluminium-bronze
 10 centimes (~ 1.52 cents) aluminium-bronze
 20 centimes (~ 3.05 cents) aluminium-bronze
  franc (~ 7.6 cents) nickel
 1 franc (~ 15.2 cents) nickel
 2 francs (~ 30.5 cents) nickel
 5 francs (~ 76 cents) nickel-clad copper-nickel
 10 francs (~ €1.52) bimetallic
 20 francs (~ €3.05) trimetallic, rarer (produced for a short period before the euro, the banknote equivalent was much more frequently used)
 100 francs (~ €15.24) silver, rarely circulated (most often bought and offered as personal gifts, but rare in commercial transactions, now worth more than its face value).

Euro exchange
Coins were freely exchangeable until 17 February 2005 at Banque de France only (commercial banks were not required to accept the old coins after the transition period in 2002, but some did), by converting their total value in francs to euros (rounded to the nearest cent) at the fixed rate of 6.55957 francs for 1 euro. Banknotes remained convertible up until 17 February 2012. By that date, franc notes worth some €550 million remained unexchanged, allowing the French state to register the corresponding sum as revenue.

Banknotes

The first franc paper money issues were made in 1795. They were assignats in denominations between 100 and 10,000 francs. These followed in 1796 by "territorial mandate promises" for 25 up to 500 francs. The treasury also issued notes that year for 25 up to 1000 francs.

In 1800, the Bank of France began issuing notes, first in denominations of 500 and 1000 francs. In the late 1840s, 100 and 200-franc notes were added, while 5, 20 and 50 francs were added in the 1860s and 70s, although the 200-franc note was discontinued.

The First World War saw the introduction of 10 and 1000-franc notes. The chambers of commerce's notgeld ("money of necessity"), from 1918 to 1926, produced 25c, 50c, 1 F, 2 F, 5 F, and 10 F notes.

Despite base-metal 5, 10 and 20 F coins being introduced between 1929 and 1933, the banknotes were not removed. In 1938, the first 5000-franc notes were added.

In 1944, the liberating Allies introduced dollar-like paper money in denominations between 2 and 1000 francs, as well as a brass 2-franc coin.

After the Second World War, 5, 10 and 20-franc notes were replaced by coins in 1950, as were the 50- and 100-franc notes in the mid-1950s. In 1954, the 10,000-franc notes were introduced.

In 1959, banknotes in circulation when the old franc was replaced by the new franc were:
500 francs: Victor Hugo
1000 francs: Cardinal de Richelieu
5000 francs: Henri IV
10,000 francs: Bonaparte 1st consul

The first issue of the new franc consisted of 500, 1000, 5000 and 10,000-franc notes overprinted with their new denominations of 5, 10, 50 and 100 new francs. This issue was followed by notes of the same design but with only the new denomination shown. A 500-new franc note was also introduced in 1960 representing Molière, replaced in 1969 by the yellow Pascal type (colloquially called a pascal). A 5-franc note was issued until 1970 and a 10-franc note (showing Hector Berlioz) was issued until 1979.

Banknotes in circulation when the franc was replaced were:

 20 francs (€3.05): Claude Achille Debussy-brown-purple (introduced 1983)
 50 francs (€7.62): Antoine de Saint-Exupéry—blue (introduced 20 October 1993, replacing Maurice Quentin de la Tour)
 100 francs (€15.24): Paul Cézanne—orange (introduced 15 December 1997, replacing Eugène Delacroix)
 200 francs (€30.49): Gustave Eiffel—red (introduced 29 October 1996, replacing Montesquieu)
 500 francs (€76.22): Pierre and Marie Curie—green (introduced 22 March 1995, replacing Blaise Pascal)

Banknotes of the series current at changeover to the Euro could be exchanged at the French central bank or other services until 17 February 2012.

Most older series were exchangeable for 10 years from date of withdrawal. As the last banknote from the previous series had been withdrawn on 31 March 1998 (200 francs, Montesquieu), the deadline for the exchange was 31 March 2008.

De facto currency
Along with the Spanish peseta, the French franc was also a de facto currency used in Andorra (which had no national currency with legal tender). It circulated alongside the Monegasque franc in Monaco, with which it had equal value. These currencies were all replaced by the euro in 2002.

See also
French euro coins
Economy of France
Napoléon (coin)

Notes

References

Citations

Bibliography

External links

Overview of French franc from the BBC
Banknotes of France
French franc (1951–1999) and euro (1999–ongoing) inflation calculators and charts
Banknotes of France: Detailed Catalog of French Francs
Historical banknotes of France 
Franc – currency at Merriam-Webster

Economic history of France
Modern obsolete currencies
Medieval currencies
Currencies replaced by the euro
Currencies of Europe
Currencies of Andorra
1860 establishments in France
2001 disestablishments in France
Currencies of Monaco
Currencies of France
Currency symbols